Ozburn-Hessey Logistics is a former American logistics company, acquired by GEODIS SA. It began business in 1951 in Nashville, Tennessee, at one point one of the largest third-party logistics companies in the USA.

In 2015, GEODIS SA, a French logistics company and division of SNCF, acquired OHL and dissolved it (it did not remain a subsidiary company). Taking over OHL's 120 distribution centers and all of its US operations, GEODIS gained a very strategic market share in the American logistics industry.

References

External links
 

Companies based in Tennessee
Logistics companies of the United States
Transportation companies based in Tennessee